Knauf USG Systems is the former legal entity of a manufacturer of cement board systems under the registered trademark name Aquapanel®.

The company was a joint venture between Knauf GmbH and USG Corporation and established in 2002 but dissolved in 2015 when USG divested itself from the joint venture leaving Knauf with sole ownership. USG and Knauf are both suppliers of building materials and systems on a worldwide basis. Knauf's Aquapanel business is based in Iserlohn, Germany. The management team is based in Dortmund, Germany.

Knauf Aquapanel Systems has manufacturing facilities in Iserlohn, Germany; Novomoskovsk, Russia; and Volos, Greece.

External links 
 Official website

Companies based in North Rhine-Westphalia
Manufacturing companies of Germany